Generoso Charles "Jerry" Rullo (June 23, 1922 – October 21, 2016) was an American professional basketball player.

Biography
He attended John Bartram High School in his hometown of Philadelphia, Pennsylvania. A  guard from Temple University, Rullo played four seasons (1946–1950) in the Basketball Association of America/National Basketball Association as a member of the Philadelphia Warriors and Baltimore Bullets. He averaged 2.9 points per game in his BAA/NBA career and won a league championship with Philadelphia in 1947. Rullo played for eight seasons in the Eastern Professional Basketball League (EPBL) for the Sunbury Mercuries. He was selected as the EPBL Most Valuable Player in 1951 and was a four-time All-EPBL team selection.

With the deaths of Ralph Kaplowitz and Angelo Musi in 2009, Rullo was the last living member of that Warriors championship team, the first in the history of the BAA/NBA. With the death of Kenny Sailors in January 2016, Rullo became the last living player from the inaugural 1946-47 season of the BAA. He died on October 21, 2016, of heart failure at Penn Medicine Rittenhouse.

BAA/NBA career statistics

Playoffs

References

External links

 

1922 births
2016 deaths
American men's basketball players
Baltimore Bullets (1944–1954) players
Guards (basketball)
Philadelphia Warriors players
Philadelphia Sphas players
Sunbury Mercuries players
Temple Owls men's basketball players
Basketball players from Philadelphia
21st-century American Jews